Winston Evans House is a historic house in Shelbyville, Tennessee, U.S.. The two-story house was built in 1900 for Winston Evans and his wife Carrie Frierson, whose family owned the land and built the Frierson-Coble House nearby. It was designed in the Classical Revival architectural style. It has been listed on the National Register of Historic Places since November 27, 1989.

References

Houses on the National Register of Historic Places in Tennessee
Neoclassical architecture in Tennessee
Houses completed in 1900
Buildings and structures in Shelbyville, Tennessee
National Register of Historic Places in Bedford County, Tennessee